Jake LeDoux (born 2 May 1985 in Port Perry, Ontario) is a Canadian actor.

In the movie "Summer's End" from 1999, he appeared together with Wendy Crewson and James Earl Jones. In 2000 was nominated to "Young Artist Award" in category: "Best Performance in a TV Movie or Pilot - Leading Young Actor"

Filmography

Movies
 1999 Summer's End - as Jamie Baldwin
 1999 Switching Goals - as Richie
 1999 Killer Deal as Nick Quinn
 2000 Love Come Down as jung Matthew
 2007 Devil's Diary as Nate
 2009 Personal Effects as Maloni

TV Series
 2000 Real Kids, Real Adventures
 2006 Smallville
 2007 The 4400
 2006 Intelligence

References

External links 
 

1985 births
Living people
Male actors from Ontario
Canadian male film actors
People from Scugog